Rookie of the Month Award may refer to:

Major League Baseball Rookie of the Month Award, presented by Major League Baseball
NBA Rookie of the Month Award, presented by the National Basketball Association